Port Said Martyrs Memorial is a monument in Al-Sharq District, Port Said. It was constructed in the form of Pharaonic obelisk covered with grey granite imitating the Egyptian ancestors – the pharaohs – who left obelisks in the sites of their victories over the enemies. The memorial was constructed to commemorate the martyrs of Port Said in the battles of the tripartite aggression during the Suez Crisis. The obelisk was erected on a base above a flame. The Museum of Modern Art in Egypt is located under the base of the memorial.

See also
 Unknown Soldier Memorial (Egypt)

References

Martyrs Memorial
Monuments and memorials in Egypt
Buildings and structures in Port Said Governorate